Aleksandr Ivanovich Sobko or Oleksandr Ivanovych Sobko (born 31 August 1982) is a former Russian and Ukrainian professional football player.

Club career
He played in the Kazakhstan Premier League for FC Bolat.

Personal life
His younger brother Vitaliy Sobko is also a footballer.

References

External links
 

1982 births
Living people
Russian people of Ukrainian descent
Russian footballers
Ukrainian footballers
Association football forwards
FC Metalist-2 Kharkiv players
FC Oskil Kupyansk players
FC Hirnyk Rovenky players
FC Helios Kharkiv players
FC Zhytychi Zhytomyr players
FC Oryol players
FC Znamya Truda Orekhovo-Zuyevo players
FC Kramatorsk players
FC Viktoriya Mykolaivka players
Ukrainian Second League players
Kazakhstan Premier League players
Ukrainian expatriate footballers
Expatriate footballers in Kazakhstan